The discography of English singer-songwriter Kate Bush consists of 10 studio albums, two live albums, two compilation albums, six video albums, four box sets, five extended plays, 36 singles, seven promotional singles, and 39 music videos.

Albums

Studio albums

Live albums

Compilation albums

Box sets

Extended plays

Singles

Promotional singles

Videography

Video albums

Music videos

Other contributions 
This is a list of original contributions that Bush has made to soundtracks, tribute albums and to other musicians' albums.

 Peter Gabriel (1980, Charisma) – "Games Without Frontiers" and "No Self Control" (backing vocals with Peter Gabriel)
 Figvres (1982, Polydor) - "Flowers" (backing vocals with Zaine Griff)
 The Seer (1986, Mercury) – "The Seer" (Big Country featuring Kate Bush)
 Ferry Aid - "Let It Be" (1987, CBS) (charity single) 
 Dancing On The Couch (1987, Chrysalis) – "The King Is Dead" (Go West featuring Kate Bush)
 The Secret Policeman’s Third Ball – The Music (1987, Virgin Records) (charity concert for Amnesty International: "Running Up That Hill" performed with David Gilmour; comedy song "Do Bears..." performed in duet with Rowan Atkinson)
 Answers to Nothing (1988, Chrysalis) – "Sister and Brother" (co-lead vocals with Midge Ure) 
 She's Having a Baby (1988, I.R.S.) – "This Woman's Work"
 The Comic Strip Presents...: "GLC: The Carnage Continues..." (1990) – "Ken", "The Confrontation" and "One Last Look Around the House Before We Go..."
 Once (1990, IRS Records) - "Once" (backing vocals with Roy Harper)
 Brazil (1992, Milan) – "Sam Lowry's 1st Dream/"Brazil"" (vocals with Michael Kamen and The National Philharmonic Orchestra of London)
 Again (1993, Sony Music) – "Kimiad" (keyboards and backing vocals with Alan Stivell)
 The Glory of Gershwin (1994, Mercury) – "The Man I Love" (vocals, with Larry Adler on harmonica)
 Common Ground – Voices of Modern Irish Music (1996, EMI) – "Women of Ireland"
 Emancipation (1996, NPG/EMI) – "My Computer" (backing vocals with Prince)
 The Golden Compass (2007, New Line) – "Lyra"

Notes

References

External links 
 Kate Bush on AllMusic
 Kate Bush on Discogs
 Kate Bush on MusicBrainz
 Kate Bush on Rate Your Music

Discography
Discographies of British artists
Rock music discographies